
South African may relate to:

 The nation of South Africa
 South African Airways
 South African English
 South African people
 Languages of South Africa
 Southern Africa

See also
 
 
 South Africa (disambiguation)

Language and nationality disambiguation pages